Naseer Ahmed Khandowa (Urdu نصیر احمد کھنڈوعہ ) is a Pakistani politician who is a member of the Provincial Assembly of Punjab.

Personal life 
He was (born March 11, 1974) in Pind Dadan Khan Pakistan. He is Doctor by profession, and worked as a political.

Political career 
Khandowa was elected to the Provincial Assembly of Punjab from the constituency Chairman UC in 2018 Pakistani by-elections on the ticket of Pakistan Tehreek-e-Insaf.

References 
Naseer Ahmed Khandowa Jhelum newspaper

UC Golepur Newspaper Chairman Naseer Ahmed Khandowa 

Jhelum Newspaper Naseer Ahmed Khandowa

Choran

1974 births
Living people
Punjabi people
People from Pind Dadan Khan
People from Pind Dadan Khan Tehsil
Pakistan Muslim League (N) politicians
Politicians from Punjab, Pakistan
Pakistan Tehreek-e-Insaf politicians
Khandowa Family
People from Jhelum District
Politicians from Jhelum